Choreutis entechna is a species of moth of the family Choreutidae. It is found in South Africa.

References

Endemic moths of South Africa
Choreutis
Moths of Africa